The New Zealand one-cent coin (minted 1967-1987, demonetised 1990), sometimes informally the penny, was the smallest denomination coin of the New Zealand dollar from the currency's introduction in 1967 to its demonetisation, along with the two-cent coin, on 30 April 1990. With a diameter of 17.53 millimetres, it is the smallest coin ever issued of the dollar, and at 2.07 grams in mass the lightest as well. Its reverse featured a fern leaf, a sign of New Zealand,  associated also with its national rugby union team. The image was designed by Reginald George James Berry, who designed the reverses for all coins introduced that year.

History

Coins of the New Zealand dollar were introduced on 10 July 1967 to replace the pre-decimal New Zealand pound, which was pegged to the British pound. The dollar was pegged at two to a pound, thus 200 cents to the pound. Although New Zealand's previous one-penny coin was 1/240 of a pound, the one-cent coin was made as an exact replacement for the penny's value. The original obverse was Arnold Machin's portrait of Queen Elizabeth II, and was used until 1985.

In 1986 the portrait was changed to the version by Raphael Maklouf, introduced to the coins of the pound sterling in 1985. In 1988, the bronze one and two-cent coins had become too expensive to produce as inflation lowered the value of the dollar and their minting ceased. They remained legal tender until 30 April 1990.

Minting figures

According to the Reserve Bank of New Zealand no one-cent coins were issued in 1968 or 1969 due to the large amount issued on their introduction in 1967, or in 1977. In years with no regular mintings, coins were still issued in mint sets.

1967: 120,000,000
1970: 10,100,000
1971: 10,000,000
1972: 10,000,000
1973: 15,000,000
1974: 35,000,000
1975: 60,000,000
1976: 20,000,000
1978: 15,000,000
1979: 35,000,000
1980: 40,000,000
1981: 10,000,000
1982: 10,000,000
1983: 40,000,000
1984: 30,000,000
1985: 40,000,000
1986: 25,000,000
1987: 27,500,000
Total issued: 552,600,000
Total value: $5,526,000.00

Counting proofs and coins in mint sets, a total of 553,466,065 (553 million) coins of the denomination were minted during its existence.

See also 

 Coins of the New Zealand dollar

References

01
One-cent coin
One-cent coins
1990 disestablishments in New Zealand
1967 establishments in New Zealand